The 1968 United States presidential election in Colorado took place on November 5, 1968, as part of the 1968 United States presidential election. State voters chose six representatives, or electors, to the Electoral College, who voted for president and vice president.

Colorado was won by former Vice President Richard Nixon (R–New York), with 50.46% of the popular vote, against Vice President Hubert Humphrey (D–Minnesota), with 41.32% of the popular vote. American Independent Party candidate George Wallace performed quite well, finishing with 7.50% of the popular vote. This was the last election until 2020 that Colorado voted more Democratic than its neighbor, New Mexico.

Nixon’s victory was the first of six consecutive Republican victories in the state, as Colorado wouldn’t vote Democratic again until Bill Clinton in 1992. After voting Republican again for the next three elections in 1996, 2000, and in 2004, it has since become a safe Democratic state.

Results

Results by county

Notes

References

Colorado
1968
1968 Colorado elections